Prophantis longicornalis is a moth of the family Crambidae. It occurs in Madagascar and La Réunion. It was formerly placed in the Spilomelinae genus Syngamia. It is of brown colour with a wingspan of 20–22 mm.

References

External links
 Lépidoptères de La Réunion - pictures of Thliptoceras longicornalis
 www.drlegrain.be - pictures of Thliptoceras longicornalis

Moths described in 1900
Spilomelinae
Moths of Madagascar
Moths of Réunion